Dafnousia is a former municipality in Phthiotis, Greece. Since the 2011 local government reform it is part of the municipality Lokroi, of which it is a municipal unit. The municipal unit has an area of 77.374 km2. In 2011 its population was 3,629. The seat of the municipality was in Livanates where three quarters of the population live. Dafnousia borders on the municipal unit of Atalanti to the south, and Agios Konstantinos to the west.

Subdivisions
The municipal unit Dafnousia is subdivided into the following communities (constituent villages in brackets):
Arkitsa (Arkitsa, Agia Aikaterini, Agios Nikolaos, Kalypso, Melidoni)
Goulemi
Livanates

External links
 Municipality of Dafnousia

References

Populated places in Phthiotis